is a 1995 video game that was released exclusively for the Japanese Super Famicom.  Based on the two-episode OVA and manga Natsuki Crisis, which was serialized in the magazine Business Jump, the player can choose from eight characters and fight on locations such as inside a budō gym, outside a high school and other locations.

Characters and voice actors
 Natsuki Kisumi (Voiced by Ai Orikasa): The heroine, who fights in a red gi. In the story mode, she must fight several opponents in her school uniform.
 Rina Takaoka (Voiced by Yūko Miyamura): Natsuki's rival and friend. Despite her diminutive size, she is gifted amateur wrestler. She uses a "cat-as-catch can" wrestling style.
 Akira Kandori (Voiced by Mari Mashiba): A powerfully built female opponent with short hair. Another wrestler, like Rina.
 Masaaki Yanagisawa (Voiced by Nobuyuki Furuta): The karateka team captain at Natsuki and Rina's school. Superhumanly strong.
 Naoya Hondō (Voiced by Nobuo Tobita): A flirtatious pretty boy at Natsuki's school. The first opponent of the Story mode.
 Endo (Voiced by Tōru Furusawa)
 Bigaro Nabeshima (Voiced by Naoki Makishima) 
 Tsuguo Nabeshima (Voiced by Ken Narita)

Reception
On release, Famicom Tsūshin scored the game a 21 out of 40.

See also
List of video games based on anime or manga

References

External links
 
 

1995 video games
Angel games
Martial arts video games
Japan-exclusive video games
Super Nintendo Entertainment System games
Super Nintendo Entertainment System-only games
Tose (company) games
Fighting games
Video games based on anime and manga
Video games developed in Japan
Multiplayer and single-player video games
Shueisha manga
Fictional karateka
Fictional female martial artists

ja:なつきクライシス#なつきクライシスバトル